"Freshman List" is a song by Canadian rapper Nav, released on March 16, 2018, as the second single from his debut studio album Reckless (2018). Produced by Rex Kudo and Charlie Handsome, it sees Nav taking aim at the hip hop magazine XXL.

Background and composition
In the song, Nav raps in his signature melodic flow while criticizing XXL, boastfully implying he is one of the best new artists of his time; he sings in the hook, "I was made for this shit, rookie of the year / I wouldn't show up for the Freshman list / Your swag expired, you ain't fresh like this / Shit on all my haters, I'ma make them pissed," He later details his rise from producing to rapping.

Charts

Certifications

References

2018 singles
2018 songs
Nav (rapper) songs
Songs written by Nav (rapper)
XO (record label) singles
Republic Records singles
Diss tracks